The Secret Life of Harpers Bizarre is an album by Harpers Bizarre, released in September 1968.

Two bonus tracks were added to the 2001 Sundazed CD reissue of this title.  They had previously been the two sides of a single:  "Both Sides Now" by Joni Mitchell and "Small Talk" by Garry Bonner and Alan Gordon.

Track listing
"Look to the Rainbow" (E.Y. Harburg, Burton Lane)
"Battle of New Orleans" (Jimmy Driftwood)
"When I Was a Cowboy" (Sylvia Fricker, Ian Tyson)
"Interlude"
"Sentimental Journey" (Les Brown, Bud Green, Ben Homer)
"Las Mananitas" (Traditional)
Medley: "Bye, Bye, Bye" (Ted Templeman, Dick Scoppettone) / "Vine Street" (Randy Newman)
"Me, Japanese Boy" (Burt Bacharach, Hal David)
"Interlude"
"I'll Build a Stairway to Paradise" (Buddy DeSylva, George Gershwin, Ira Gershwin)
"Green Apple Tree" (Dick Scoppettone, Ted Templeman)
"Sit Down, You're Rocking the Boat" (Frank Loesser)
"Interlude"
"I Love You, Mama" (Ron Elliott)
"Funny How Love Can Be" (Leon Bowman)
"Mad" (Dick Scoppettone, Ted Templeman)
"Look to the Rainbow" (E.Y. Harburg, Burton Lane)
"The Drifter" (Roger Nichols, Paul Williams)
"Reprise"

References

1968 albums
Harpers Bizarre albums
Albums produced by Lenny Waronker
Warner Records albums